This is a list of nursing schools in the Philippines.

A
Adamson University
Ago Foundation College - Naga City
Ago Medical and Educational Center - Legazpi, Albay
Angeles University Foundation
University of Santo Tomas-Legazpi - Legazpi, Albay
Araullo University - Cabanatuan
Arellano University College of Nursing
Asian College of Technology
Asia Pacific College of Advanced Studies
Ateneo de Davao University
Ateneo de Naga University
Ateneo de Zamboanga University

B
Baguio Central University
Baliuag University College of Nursing
Bataan Peninsula State University
Benguet State University
Bicol College - Legazpi, Albay
Bicol University - Legazpi, Albay
Brokenshire College
Bukidnon State University
Bulacan State University

C
Capitol Medical Center Colleges
Cebu Doctors' University
Cebu Institute of Technology
Cebu Normal University
Cebu Sacred Heart College - Cebu City
Cebu Technological University (CTU) - Cebu City Medical Center College of Nursing
Central Philippine University - The first nursing school - started in 1906 and produced the first 3 graduates in 1909.
Centro Escolar University
Chinese General Hospital College of Nursing
Christ the King College
Colegio de San Lorenzo Ruiz de Manila of Northern Samar, Inc. - Catarman, Northern Samar
Colegio de Kidapawan
Cor Jesu College

D
Davao Doctors College
Davao Medical School Foundation
De La Salle Medical and Health Sciences Institute
De La Salle Lipa
Dominican College of Santa Rosa
Dr. Carlos S. Lanting College

E
 Emilio Aguinaldo College

F
Far Eastern University Institute of Nursing
Father Saturnino Urios University - Butuan
Fernandez College of Arts and Technology
Our Lady of Fatima University

G
Global City Innovative College
Dr. Gloria D. Lacson College - San Leonardo, Nueva Ecija
Good Samaritan Colleges Cabanatuan

H
Holy Child College of Butuan
Holy Infant College College of Nursing - Tacloban
Holy Name University College of Nursing - Tagbilaran, Bohol

I
Ifugao State College (ISCAF)
Iloilo Doctors College
Immaculate Conception College Albay
Immaculate Conception College Cabanatuan

J
Jose C. Feliciano College
Jose Rizal University College of Nursing

K
Kester Grant College

L
La Salle University (Ozamiz City)
La Fortuna College Cabanatuan
Liceo de Cagayan University
Lorma Colleges
Lourdes College
Lyceum Institute of Technology - Laguna
Lyceum of Batangas
Lyceum of the Philippines University - Manila
Lyceum - St. Cabrini College of Allied Medicine - Batangas

M
Manila Adventist Medical Center and Colleges
Manila Central University
Manila Tytana Colleges - formerly Manila Doctors College
Mariano Marcos State University
Mati Doctors College
Metropolitan Medical Center College of Arts, Science and Technology (formerly Metropolitan Hospital College of Nursing)
Mindanao Medical Foundation College
Mindanao Sanitarium and Hospital College - Iligan
Misamis University
Mountain View College

N
Naga College Foundation - Naga City
New Era University
Northeastern College - Santiago City
North Valley College
Notre Dame of Dadiangas University
Notre Dame of Jolo College - Jolo, Sulu
Notre Dame of Kidapawan College
Notre Dame of Marbel University
Notre Dame University (Philippines)
Nueva Ecija Doctors College - Cabanatuan
Nueva Ecija University of Science and Technology - Cabanatuan
 Notre Dame of Midsayap College- The First Notre Dame School in Asia
O
Olivarez College
Our Lady of Fatima University
Our Lady of the Pillar Colleges - Cauayan, Isabela

P
Pamantasan ng Lungsod ng Maynila College of Nursing
Philippine Rehabilitation Institute Foundation, Inc.
Philippine College of Health Sciences, Inc.
Pines City Colleges
Polytechnic College of Davao del Sur
Province of Negros Occidental-Northern Negros State College of Science and Technology School of Nursing

R
Doña Remedios Trinidad Romualdez Medical Foundation - Tacloban
Remedios Trinidad Romualdez Memorial Schools, Inc. - Makati Medical Center

S
San Juan De Dios Educational Foundation, Inc.
San Pedro College
St. Anthony's College - Antique - The first nursing school in Antique
St. Ferdinand College - Ilagan, Isabela
St. Joseph College Cavite City
Saint Louis University, Baguio City
St. Luke's College of Nursing, Trinity University of Asia
Saint Mary's College of Tagum
Saint Mary's University
St. Paul University Iloilo
St. Paul University Philippines
Silliman University
Southern Luzon State University
South Philippine Adventist College
Southville International School and Colleges
Southwestern University (Philippines) - Cebu City
STI College San Pablo - College of Nursing
Systems Plus College Foundation

T
Tabaco College - Tabaco City, Albay
Tanchuling College - Legazpi City, Albay
Tarlac State University
Tomas Claudio Memorial College
Tomas del Rosario College

U
Universidad de Manila
Universidad de Sta. Isabel
Universidad de Zamboanga
University of Baguio
University of Batangas
University of Cebu - College of Nursing (formerly Chong Hua Hospital - School of Nursing) - Lapu-Lapu and Mandaue Campus
University of Iloilo
University of La Salette - College of Nursing
University of Mindanao Digos Campus
University of Perpetual Help System Dalta - Molino
University of San Agustin
University of San Carlos
University of San Jose-Recoletos
University of Southeastern Mindanao
University of Southern Philippines Foundation - College of Nursing, Cebu City
University of Saint La Salle
University of Santo Tomas College of Nursing
University of the Cordilleras
UERMMMC College of Nursing
University of the Immaculate Conception
University of the Philippines Manila
University of the Visayas - Gullas Medical Center

V
Visayas State University - Baybay City, Leyte

W
West Visayas State University
Wesleyan University (Philippines) - Cabanatuan

X
Xavier University – Ateneo de Cagayan

Defunct nursing schools
This is a list of defunct nursing schools in the Philippines.

I
 Iligan Capitol College
L
 La Salle College
 Lyceum of Iligan Foundation

M
 Medina College - Pagadian
 Medina College - Ozamiz 
 Medina College - Ipil
 Mother College
N
 North Central Mindanao College
S
 Saint Michael’s College

References

External links
Nursing schools in the Philippines

Philippines
 
Nursing in the Philippines
Nursing colleges